Ramy is an American comedy-drama streaming television series that premiered on April 19, 2019, on Hulu. In May 2019, Hulu renewed the series for a second season, which premiered on May 29, 2020. The series stars Ramy Youssef as the titular character. In July 2020, Hulu renewed the series for a third season, which premiered on September 30, 2022.

The series has been praised for its portrayal of American Muslims when most Western pop culture depictions are "usually as the bad guys". In January 2020, Youssef was awarded the Golden Globe Award for Best Actor in a Television Series Musical or Comedy for his role in Ramy. Additionally, Youssef was nominated for two Primetime Emmy Awards for Outstanding Directing for a Comedy Series and Outstanding Lead Actor in a Comedy Series, and in 2020 he also received the Peabody Award.

Premise
Ramy follows "a first-generation American Muslim who is on a spiritual journey in his politically divided New Jersey neighborhood. It explores the challenges of what it is like being caught between an Egyptian community that thinks life is a moral test, and a generation that thinks life has no consequences."

Cast and characters

Main
Ramy Youssef as Ramy Hassan, the protagonist of the series. He is a millennial American Muslim who grapples with his faith and lifestyle, to judgment of his friends and family.
Mohammed Amer as Mo, Ramy's cousin who owns a diner.
Hiam Abbass as Maysa Hassan, Ramy's mother.
Dave Merheje as Ahmed, Ramy's friend and a doctor.
Amr Waked as Farouk Hassan, Ramy's father.
May Calamawy as Dena Hassan, the sister of Ramy. Although she is a graduate student, Dena is frustrated that her actions and behavior are still restricted by her overprotective parents. This causes her to regularly critique the double standards she and Ramy are judged against.
Laith Nakli as Uncle Naseem, the boisterous uncle of Ramy and Dena. He owns a jewelry business, where he employs Ramy after his firing from a startup. He casually makes sexist and anti-Semitic statements, despite working with Jewish jewelers. Naseem is very protective of his family, especially of his sister Maysa. (recurring season 1; main season 2 and 3)

Recurring
Steve Way as Steve Russo, longtime friend and coworker of Ramy. They become acquainted after the September 11 attacks, when Ramy is alienated due to his Muslim faith
Mahershala Ali as Sheikh Ali Malik (season 2)
MaameYaa Boafo as Zainab (season 2 and 3)
Rosaline Elbay as Amani, Ramy's cousin (season 1 and 2)
Shadi Alfons as Shadi
Kate Miller as Vivian
Michael Chernus as Michael
Jade Eshete as Fatima
Poorna Jagannathan as Salma (season 1)
Molly Gordon as Sarah (season 1 and 3)
Jared Abrahamson as Dennis (season 2)
Rana Roy as Yasmina (guest season 1 and 2; recurring season 3)
Julian Sergi as Yuval (season 3)

Guest
Dina Shihabi as Nour (season 1)
Jake Lacy as Kyle (season 1)
Anna Konkle as Chloe (season 1)
Elisha Henig as Young Ramy (season 1)
Mia Khalifa as herself (season 2)
Omar Metwally as Bin Khalied (season 2)
Beshoy Mehany as Sufi Center Attendee (season 2)
Randa Jarrar as Hosna (season 2)
Waleed Zuaiter as Yassir (season 2) 
Maybe Burke as Sophia (season 2)
Bella Hadid as Lena (season 3)
James Badge Dale as Sheikh Abu Bakar Miller (season 3)
Sarita Choudhury as Olivia (season 3)
Christopher Abbott as Silvak (season 3)
Majid Jordan as Halal Brothers (season 3)
Robert Herjavec as Himself (season 3)
Amy Landecker as Kendra (season 3)

Episodes

Season 1 (2019)

Season 2 (2020)

Season 3 (2022)

Production

Development
On October 4, 2017, it was announced that Hulu had given the production a pilot presentation order. The series was created by Ramy Youssef, Ari Katcher and Ryan Welch, and Youssef and Welch both wrote episodes for the series. Executive producers include Katcher, Welch, and Jerrod Carmichael. Production companies involved with the series include A24.

On April 18, 2018, it was announced that Hulu had given the production a series order for a first season. On February 11, 2019, it was announced that the series would premiere on April 19, 2019. On May 1, 2019, it was reported that Hulu renewed the series for a second season, which premiered on May 29, 2020. On July 9, 2020, Hulu renewed the series for a third season, which premiered on September 30, 2022.

Casting
Alongside the series order announcement, it was confirmed that Ramy Youssef would star in the series. On October 19, 2018, it was announced that May Calamawy had been cast in a series regular role. In July 2019, it was announced Mahershala Ali would guest star in the second season. In November 2019, it was announced Laith Nakli had been upped to a series regular.

On March 31, 2022, it was announced that Bella Hadid would have a recurring guest role in the third season. It will also be her acting debut in the show.

Release

Broadcast 
In Europe, the series is available to stream on StarzPlay. In the United Kingdom, the series premiered in March 2021 on Channel 4. In Latin America, the series premiered in August 2020 on FX.
In India, the series is available on Amazon Prime. In South Africa, the series is available to stream on Showmax.

The first 2 seasons leave Lionsgate+ in Europe on January 8, 2023.

Premiere 
The series held its world premiere during the 2019 South by Southwest film festival in Austin, Texas, as a part of the festival's "Episodic Premieres" series of screenings. It won the Episodic Audience Award for the festival.

Reception
On review aggregator Rotten Tomatoes, the first season holds an approval rating of 98% based on 42 reviews, with an average rating of 8.1/10. The website's critical consensus reads, "An insightful and hilarious glimpse into the life of a Muslim American family, Ramy perfectly articulates the precarious nature and nuances of identity and announces Ramy Youssef as a talent to watch." On Metacritic, it has a weighted average score of 87 out of 100, based on 18 critics, indicating "universal acclaim".

On Rotten Tomatoes, the second season holds an approval rating of 95% based on 43 reviews, with an average rating of 8.1/10. The website's critical consensus reads, "Ramy's layered approach yields rich rewards in a poignant second season that digs deeper without losing faith in the power of levity." On Metacritic, it has a weighted average score of 82 out of 100, based on 12 critics, indicating "universal acclaim".

Accolades
For its first season, Ramy Youssef was nominated for the Golden Globe Award for Best Actor – Television Series Musical or Comedy. He won the award 
at the 77th Golden Globe Awards in 2020.

References

External links

2010s American comedy-drama television series
2020s American comedy-drama television series
2019 American television series debuts
English-language television shows
Arabic-language television shows
Hulu original programming
Television series by A24
Television series about Islam